The Most Beautiful Moment in Life, Pt. 1 is the third extended play by South Korean boy band BTS. The album was released on April 29, 2015 by Big Hit Entertainment. It is available in two versions and contains nine tracks, with "I Need U" as the lead single and "Dope (쩔어)" as a promoted follow-up single.

Background and release
Shifting their sound and image from solely aggressive, masculine hip hop to more diverse styles, BTS wanted to express the beauty and anxiousness of "youth" and settled on the title of "花樣年華" (Korean: 화양연화; RR: Hwayangyeonhwa), loosely interpreted to define "youth" as "the most beautiful moment in life." On April 6, 2015, BTS announced their comeback date for April 29, and revealed that all members participated in writing songs for the album.  On April 17, an animated comeback trailer was uploaded on Big Hit Entertainment's official YouTube channel, which featured the album's intro track performed by Suga. On April 19, Big Hit Entertainment announced the title of the album, and the first set of member concept photos was posted on their official Twitter account. Along with the reveal of the second set of concept photos, it was stated that two different cover design versions of the album would be released, Pink and White. The album would also include a 120-page photobook and a random photo card. Big Hit Entertainment released the first music video teaser for the album's lead single "I Need U" on April 23. On April 26, the album's track list was revealed, and an album preview was uploaded on Big Hit Entertainment's YouTube channel. Two of the album's tracks, "Boyz with Fun" and "Converse High," had previously been previewed at the 2015 BTS Live Trilogy Episode I: BTS Begins concert held in Seoul on March 29.

On June 14, BTS posted concept photos for the follow-up promotion track "Dope (쩔어)" through their official Facebook page, captioned with the opening line of the song: “Welcome, first time with BTS?"

Promotion 
Two tracks from the album, "Boyz with Fun" and "Converse High", were deemed unfit for broadcast by KBS due to lyrics containing swears and brand names, such as Converse, Chanel, and Alexander McQueen. The latter track was also deemed unfit for broadcast by MBC. "I Need U" was approved for broadcast and BTS held their first comeback stage performance on M Countdown on April 30. A music video for the song was released that same day. On April 29, prior to the release of the music video at midnight, BTS broadcast a live comeback special, I NEED U, BTS ON AIR, through Naver Starcast. The group went on to successfully promote across multiple channels and various programs, including on KBS, MBC, SBS, and Arirang TV. BTS wrapped up promotions for "I Need U" with a final performance on the May 31 broadcast of Inkigayo.

On June 13, BTS announced plans to hold follow-up music show promotions with the track "Dope (쩔어)". A music video for the song was released on YouTube on June 24. It features each of the members dressed up to represent various occupations, such as a police officer or office worker, while dancing fast-paced choreography. The dance was choreographed by Keone Madrid, and the music video was produced and directed by GDW. BTS held their first performance of the song on the June 25 broadcast of M Countdown, and concluded promotions on July 5 with a final performance on Inkigayo. "Dope" gained considerable attention internationally as it became the subject of numerous reaction videos on YouTube, the most noteworthy being from the Fine Brothers channel, and went on to become BTS' first music video to surpass 100 million views on the platform. This made BTS the first K-pop group outside of the "big three" Korean entertainment agencies—SM, YG, and JYP—to achieve the feat.

Commercial performance
The Most Beautiful Moment in Life, Part 1 debuted at number two on the Gaon Weekly Album Chart in South Korea and rose to number one the following week. It peaked at number two on the Monthly Album Chart in May. In China, BTS ranked number one for two consecutive weeks on the Gaon Weibo Chart, a weekly rank of the top 10 most popular Korean artists based on data gathered from China's most popular social media platform, Weibo. In Japan, the EP debuted at number 24 on the Oricon Weekly Album Chart and number 45 on the Oricon Monthly Album Chart. The EP ended 2015 as the sixth best-selling album of the year in South Korea, with 274,135 copies sold.

In the United States, the album debuted at number two on the Billboard World Albums Chart, peaked at number six on the Heatseekers Chart, and entered the Independent Albums Chart for the first time at number 20, all of which were the highest for any BTS album at the time. Six of the EP's songs debuted on the World Digital Songs chart, with "I Need U" ranking the highest at number four, followed by "Dope" at number 11, "Hold Me Tight" at number 12, "Boyz with Fun" at number 13, "Converse High" at number 15, and "Outro: Love is Not Over" at number 25. "Dope" peaked at number three in July after BTS completed promotions for the single.

Accolades
The EP was nominated for Album of the Year at the 2015 Mnet Asian Music Awards but did not win. In January 2016, it won two Bonsang awards for physical album sales, at the 25th Seoul Music Awards and the 30th Golden Disc Awards held on the 14th and 21st respectively.

Track listing
Credits adapted from the liner notes of the physical album  and from registered songs in KOMCA.

Charts

Weekly charts

Monthly charts

Yearly charts

Sales and certifications

Release history

See also
 List of K-pop songs on the Billboard charts
 List of K-pop albums on the Billboard charts
 List of Gaon Album Chart number ones of 2015
 List of Gaon Album Chart number ones of 2016

References

External links
 Big Hit Labels "The Most Beautiful Moment in Life, Pt. 1" 'The Most Beautiful Moment in Life' Comeback Trailer
 1thek "The Most Beautiful Moment in Life, Pt. 1" 'The Most Beautiful Moment in Life' Comeback Trailer
 Big Hit Labels "The Most Beautiful Moment in Life, Pt. 1" Preview
 1theK "The Most Beautiful Moment in Life, Pt. 1" Preview
 Big Hit Labels "I Need U" Music Video
 1theK "I Need U" Music Video
 Big Hit Labels "I Need U 19+" Music Video
 1theK "I Need U 19+" Music Video
 Big Hit Labels "Dope" Music Video
 1theK "Dope" Music Video

BTS EPs
Korean-language EPs
2015 EPs
Hybe Corporation EPs